Yorlen José Cordero Díaz (born 5 February 2002) is a Venezuelan footballer who plays as a right winger for Venezuelan Primera División side Mineros de Guayana.

Career

Club career
Cordero is a product of Monagas, where he played since childhood. On 8 August 2018, Cordero got his official debut for Monagas against LALA FC in Copa Venezuela. His league debut came in October 2018 against Deportivo Anzoátegui, which was one out of his two league appearances in the 2018 season.

In the 2019 season, Cordero only made one appearance in the league for Monagas, while he made seven in Copa Venezuela. He got his breakthrough for Monagas in the 2020 season, with 16 games and one goal. After leaving Monagas at the end of 2021, Cordero remained without contract until June 2022, where he signed with Mineros de Guayana.

References

External links
 

Living people
2002 births
Venezuelan footballers
People from Maturín
Association football wingers
21st-century Venezuelan people
Venezuelan Primera División players
Monagas S.C. players
A.C.C.D. Mineros de Guayana players